Kimball Hale Dimmick served in the California legislature and during the Mexican–American War he served in the US Army. Dimmick signed the California Constitution as well as serving as the District Attorney for Los Angeles.

References

American military personnel of the Mexican–American War
Members of the California State Legislature
District attorneys in California
19th-century American politicians
Year of birth missing
Year of death missing